Charles Magezi Mbire is a businessman, entrepreneur, and industrialist in Uganda. He was reported to be the wealthiest indigenous Ugandan, with an estimated net worth exceeding US$200 million as of January 2012.

Background
Mbire was born Charles Magezi in 1959 to Ponsiano Mbire and Thereza Mbire in Mparo, Rukiga District, southwestern Uganda. He is the third-born in the family with three sisters, two of them older than him, and two younger brothers. He attended Kabale Primary School and Kitante Primary School for his elementary education. He studied at St. Mary's College Kisubi for his O-Level education. He then attended Namasagali College for his A-Level studies. He studied business and economics and graduated with the honors degree of Bachelor of Science, from Essex University in England. He went on to obtain a Master of Business Administration from Leicester University, also in the United Kingdom. His investments are in telecommunications, finance,  energy, real estate, pharmaceuticals, agribusiness, and transportation.

Business interests
Mbire is part owner and member of the board of directors of the following Ugandan businesses:

 Afro Alpine Pharma Limited
 East Africa Fish Farming Limited
 Eskom Uganda Limited
 Invesco (Uganda) Limited
 MTN Uganda Limited
 Polino Holdings Limited
 Sunco Investments Limited
 Bomi Holdings Limited
 Rift Valley Railways
 Chui Investments Limited - An investment company specializing in the construction, operations and ownership of small and medium-sized power stations in Uganda
 Bank of Baroda (Uganda).

Other responsibilities
Mbire was appointed chairman of the Uganda Securities Exchange in 2010. He is also a member of the Presidential Investor Roundtable, an elite group of businesspeople who advise the President of Uganda on how to improve business competitiveness and business conditions in the country.

Net worth
In December 2008, it was estimated that Mbire's net worth exceeded US$65 million. In January 2012, his net worth was estimated to have increased to greater than US$200 million.
In January 2019, he was estimated to be worth US$400 million

Photos
Photo of Charles Mbire In 2012

See also
Katuna
Kabale District
Ecobank Uganda
Rift Valley Railways
List of wealthiest people in Uganda

References

External links
  Charles Mbire Owns Afro Alpine Pharma
 Profile of Tereza Mbire, The Mother of Charles Mbire

1959 births
Living people
Ugandan businesspeople
People from Kabale District
Alumni of the University of Essex
People from Western Region, Uganda
Alumni of the University of Leicester
People educated at St. Mary's College Kisubi